Ben or Benjamin Lamb may refer to:

Ben Lamb (actor) (born 1989), English actor
Ben Lamb (poker player) (born 1985), American poker player
Benjamin Lamb (fl. 1715), English organist

See also
Ben Lam (born 1991), New Zealand rugby union player
Benjamin G. Lamme (1864–1924), American electrical engineer